Leonard Burlington Bolton was an Australian politician. He was a member of the Western Australian Legislative Council representing the Metropolitan Province from his election on 6 February 1932 until the end of his term in 1948. Bolton was a member of the National Party before becoming a member of the Liberal Party.

References 

Members of the Western Australian Legislative Council
20th-century Australian politicians